Arbitration committee, arbitration commission or arbitration council may refer to:

 Arbitral tribunal, a panel of impartial adjudicators convened to resolve a dispute by way of arbitration
 Arbitration Committee, an arbitration tribunal used on Wikimedia projects such as Wikipedia